Improper Burial is an EP by Holy Grail released in 2009 under Prosthetic Records.

Track listing

Personnel 
Blake Mount - bass
Tyler Meahl - drums
Eli Santana - guitars 
James Paul Luna - vocals
James J. LaRue - guitars

Additional personnel 
Ed Repka - cover art
Chris Rakestraw - producer, mixing
Relyt Lhaem - mixing
Carson Slovak - layout

References 

2009 EPs
Holy Grail (band) albums